The following lists events that happened during 1987 in Sri Lanka.

Incumbents
 President – J. R. Jayewardene
 Prime Minister – Ranasinghe Premadasa
 Chief Justice – Suppiah Sharvananda

Events
 The Indo-Sri Lanka Peace Accord was signed in Colombo on 29 July 1987, between Indian Prime Minister Rajiv Gandhi and Sri Lankan President J. R. Jayewardene.
 Civil war rages in the north between the LTTE and the government.
 In June 1987, the Sri Lankan Army besieged the town Jaffna, civilian casualties began to mount.
1987 anti-Sinhalese riots break out, killing over 200 Sinhalese civilians and displacing thousands more.

Births
 February 4 – Gayas Christopher, cricketer

Notes 

a.  Gunaratna, Rohan. (1998). Pg.353, Sri Lanka's Ethnic Crisis and National Security, Colombo: South Asian Network on Conflict Research.

References